The 19th Canadian Comedy Awards honoured the best live, television, film, and Internet comedy of 2018.  Canadian Comedy Awards, also known as Beavers, were awarded in 22 categories, determined by votes from the public and industry members. The awards ceremony was held at Toronto's Second City on 4 June 2019, hosted by Ali Hassan.

Nominations were led by feature Room for Rent and web series A Gay Victorian Affair with five each.  A Gay Victorian Affair won all four Beavers for web series, while Room for Rent won three in film and Baroness von Sketch Show won three in television.  Chanty Marostica won for Best Stand-up and Comedy Album of the Year, and Catherine O'Hara was honoured as Comedic Artist of the Year.

Ceremony

The awards ceremony was scheduled to be held on Sunday 2 June 2019 at the Yuk Yuk's comedy club in Toronto, Ontario, which had donated the use of its facilities.  However, the club was not accessible and producers of the no-budget show sought another free venue, to accommodate a cast member of Generally Hospital who uses a power wheelchair.  Generally Hospital addresses themes of disability, and its cast was nominated for Best Live Ensemble.

The awards ceremony was held at Toronto's Second City on 4 June 2019, hosted by Ali Hassan with presenters Ron Sparks, Kate Davis, Andrew Chapman, and Martha Chaves. The ceremony was executive produced by Kyra Williams, who had received the Roger Abbott Award at the 2014 ceremony.

Winners and nominees
The Beaver was awarded in twenty-two categories.  Only industry members could vote in the nine categories for best direction, performance and writing in features, TV series or specials, or web series.  The other thirteen categories were open to public voting. Voting took place between 19 April and 10 May 2019.

Winners are listed first and highlighted in boldface:

Multimedia

Live

Television

Internet

Multiple wins
The following people, shows, films, etc. received multiple awards

Multiple nominations
The following people, shows, films, etc. received multiple nominations

Footnotes

References

External links
Canadian Comedy Awards official website

Canadian Comedy Awards
Canadian Comedy Awards
Awards
Awards